Blastobasis lecaniella is a moth in the family Blastobasidae. It was described by August Busck in 1913. It is found in Guyana.

References

Natural History Museum Lepidoptera generic names catalog

Blastobasis
Moths described in 1913